W. N. Bergan–J. C. Lauber Company Building is a historic manufacturing complex located at South Bend, St. Joseph County, Indiana.  The original Bergan Building was built in 1882, and is a two-story, Italianate style brick industrial building.  It features an ornate cornice and frieze. Also on the property are two one-story contributing brick buildings.  The buildings have housed the J. C. Lauber Sheet Metal Company, Inc. since 1900. It was listed on the National Register of Historic Places in 1999.

References

External links
J. C. Lauber Sheet Metal Company, Inc. history

Industrial buildings and structures on the National Register of Historic Places in Indiana
Industrial buildings completed in 1882
Buildings and structures in South Bend, Indiana
National Register of Historic Places in St. Joseph County, Indiana
1882 establishments in Indiana